Knot Ajaw was a king of the Maya city-state Caracol in Belize, a successor of his father Yajaw Te' K'inich II. He reigned AD 599-613>.

Name
Ajaw (Ahaw) means "king" or "ruler" in Mayan. This king is also known as Ruler IV, Ahaw Serpent and Flaming Ahaw.

Biography

Birth and family
Knot Ajaw was the eldest son of the king Yajaw Te' K'inich II. His mother was Lady 1 of Caracol. His stepmother was Lady Batz' Ek' and his half-brother was K'an II. Grandparents of Knot Ajaw were K'an I and Lady K'al K'inich (named after the Sun god).

He was born on November 28, 575.

Reign
He acceded on June 24, 599. He may have co-ruled during the last years of his father.

Stela 6 accords a full emblem glyph to a lord named Chekaj K'inich, who is referred to as a "younger brother", presumably of Yajaw Te' K'inich; this suggests that he may have acted as a sort of "guardian uncle" to Knot Ajaw. 

His successor was his younger brother.

References

Kings of Caracol
6th century in the Maya civilization
7th century in the Maya civilization
6th-century monarchs in North America
7th-century monarchs in North America